A folliculosebaceous-apocrine hamartoma, also known as "follicular-apocrine hamartoma", is a benign proliferation of the folliculosebaceous-apocrine unit.

See also
 List of cutaneous conditions

References

Epidermal nevi, neoplasms, and cysts